Living Dub Volume 3 is a  dub album of reggae music by the Jamaican singer Burning Spear (Winston Rodney). It was released in 1996.

Track listing
Dub Peace
Dub Creation
Dub Not Stupid
Dub Subject in School
Dub This Man
Dub Rastaman
Dub Legal
Dub Nation
Dub the World
Dub Old Timer
Dub Africa
Dub Burning
Dub Business
Dub Lovin

Credits
All Songs Written by Winston Rodney and Published by Burning Spear Publishing, ASCAP
Executive Producer - Burning Music Productions 
Recorded at Grove Recording Studio, Ocho Rios, St. Ann, Jamaica 
Recording Engineer - Barry O'Hare 
Mixed by Barry O'Hare except: "World Dub" and "Loving Dub" mixed by Michael Sauvage 
Project Coordinator for Heartbeat - Garret Vandermolen
Mastered by Dr. Toby Mountain at Northeastern Digital Recording, Southborough, MA
Special Thanks To Karl Young, Barry O'Hare, Tedo Davis, Sonia Rodney, Anthony "Jolly" Rhoden, Carolyn Marr, and Mutabaruka

Musicians
Winston Rodney - vocals, percussion, akete, harmony
Nelson Miller - drums, percussion, backing vocals on "Subject In School"
Paul Beckford - bass
Lenford Richards - lead guitar, funde
Lenval "Shayar" Jarrett - rhythm guitar
Jay Noel - synthesizer on "Africa" and "Creation"
Alvin Haughton - percussion
James Smith - trumpet
Charles Dickey - trombone
Mark Wilson - saxophone
Additional Musicians
Robbie Lyn - piano, synthesizers
Basil Cunningham - bass on "Legal "Hustlers"
Dean Fraser - saxophone
Ronald "Nambo" Robinson - trombone
Junior "Chico" Chin - trumpet
Uziah "Sticky" Thompson - percussion
Carol "Passion" Nelson - harmony vocals
Rupert Bent - lead guitar
Archibald "Tedo" Davis - backing vocals on "Subject In School"

Burning Spear albums
1996 albums
Dub albums